Parerga and Paralipomena (Greek for "Appendices" and "Omissions", respectively) is a collection of philosophical reflections by Arthur Schopenhauer published in 1851. The selection was compiled not as a summation of or introduction to Schopenhauer's philosophy, but as augmentary readings for those who had already embraced it, although the author maintained it would be comprehensible and of interest to the uninitiated nevertheless. The collection is divided into two volumes, covering first the parerga and thereafter the paralipomena to that philosophy. The parerga are six extended essays intended as supplementary to the author's thought. The paralipomena, shorter elaborations divided by topic into thirty-one subheadings, cover material hitherto unaddressed by the philosopher but deemed by him to be complementary to the parerga.

Contents 

Volume One (Parerga)

 Preface
 Sketch of a History of the Doctrine of the Ideal and the Real
 Fragments for the History of Philosophy
 On Philosophy at the Universities
 Transcendent Speculation on the Apparent Deliberateness in the Fate of the Individual
 Essay on Spirit Seeing and everything connected therewith
 Aphorisms on the Wisdom of Life:
 Fundamental division
 What a Man is
 What a Man has
 What a Man represents
 Counsels and Maxims
 On the Different Periods of Life

Volume Two (Paralipomena)

Stray yet Systematically Arranged Thoughts on a Variety of Subjects:
 On Philosophy and its Method
 On Logic and Dialectic1
 Ideas concerning the Intellect generally and in all Respects
 Some Observations on the Antithesis of the Thing-in-itself and the Phenomenon
 A few Words on Pantheism
 On Philosophy and Natural Science
 On the Theory of Colours
 On Ethics
 On Jurisprudence and Politics
 On the Doctrine of the Indestructibility of our True Nature by Death
 Additional Remarks on the Doctrine of the Vanity of Existence
 Additional Remarks on the Doctrine of the Suffering of the World
 On Suicide
 Additional Remarks on the Doctrine of the Affirmation and Denial of the Will-to-Live
 On Religion
 Some Remarks on Sanskrit Literature
 Some Archaeological Observations
 Some Mythological Observations
 On the Metaphysics of the Beautiful and Aesthetics
 On Judgement, Criticism, Approbation, and Fame
 On Learning and the Learned
 On Thinking for Oneself
 On Authorship and Style
 On Reading and Books
 On Language and Words
 Psychological Remarks
 On Women
 On Education
 On Physiognomy
 On Din and Noise
 Similes, Parables, and Fables2

1 includes an introduction to The Art of Being Right, Schopenhauer's posthumously published discourse on rhetoric.

2 describes the hedgehog's dilemma, an analogy about the challenges of human intimacy.

Publication 

In light of the unenthusiastic reception of the philosopher's earlier publications, publishers were reluctant to commit to this, his last major work. It was only after significant difficulty and through the persuasion of the philosopher's disciple Julius Frauenstädt that Hayn of Berlin consented to publish the two volumes in a print run of 750 copies—with an honorarium of only ten copies for its author.

Parerga and Paralipomena drew the attention of John Oxenford, a noted observer and translator of German literary culture, who contributed a favourable, albeit anonymous, review of the work for the English quarterly journal Westminster Review in 1852. The following year, Oxenford would write for the journal an article on Schopenhauer's philosophy entitled "Iconoclasm in German Philosophy", which, translated into German and printed in the Vossische Zeitung would spark immediate interest of Schopenhauer's work in Germany and propel the obscure figure to lasting philosophical prominence. In the following years, Schopenhauer succeeded in publishing new editions of all his previous work on the strength of the revived interest, although his plans for a revised edition of Parerga and Paralipomena were stymied by the deterioration of his health in the months preceding his death in 1860.

Style and influence 

The subject matter and stylistic arrangement of the paralipomena were significant influences on the work of philosopher and psychologist Paul Rée, and through him most notably the philosopher Friedrich Nietzsche, whose later work explores—following Schopenhauer—the relation of man to himself, the universe, the state, and women through the art of aphorism.

Notes

Bibliography

External links 
 (contains selections from Parerga and Paralipomena)
 Essays of Schopenhauer by Arthur Schopenhauer contains selections from Parerga and Paralipomena
 The Essays of Arthur Schopenhauer; Religion, a Dialogue, Etc. contains selections from Parerga and Paralipomena
 "Iconoclasm in German Philosophy" in The Westminster Review, Volume 59, 1853 (see p. 388)
 Pararerga und Paralipomena – Link to the book at archive.org (German fraktur)
 Schopenhauer Α. Sämtliche Werke. In 5 Bde. Stuttgart / Frankfurt am Main, 1976. Bd. 4; Bd. 5.

1851 non-fiction books
Essay collections
Philosophy books
Works by Arthur Schopenhauer
Works about philosophical pessimism